Anne Karin Hamre (born 1965) is a Norwegian politician and civil servant. She served as the County Governor of Sogn og Fjordane county from 2011 until 2018. She was the first woman to hold this position as well as the youngest governor in the country. She was also the last governor of Sogn og Fjordane because on 1 January 2019, she was replaced by the new County Governor of Vestland.  Since she resigned in the fall of 2018, her assistant governor, Gunnar O. Hæreid was the acting governor until the end of the year.

Starting in the fall of 2018, Hamre took a job in the Ministry of Local Government and Regional Development leading a department on regional development.

References

1965 births
Living people
University of Bergen alumni
County governors of Norway
Norwegian civil servants